The International Early Psychosis Association (IEPA) is a professional body and international network for those with a professional interest in early psychosis intervention.

History 
The need for a professional network was proposed at a conference in Stratford-upon-Avon, England, in June 1997, and then the association was formed in 1998.

Aims 
The objectives of the IEPA, as listed on their website. They include enhancing the awareness of early psychosis and the process of recovery, providing a collaborative network for stakeholders, and contributing to the development of knowledge, research, and best practice for early psychosis.

Executive group and membership
The IEPA is governed by a group of officers, elected by members every two years. Membership of the association is free and open to anyone with an interest in early intervention. Membership may be applied for online via a web-based application form. There are over 8,500 members as of 2022.

Conferences 
Following the inaugural conference in Melbourne in 1996 (Verging on Reality), international academic conferences have been held every two years in New York (2000), Copenhagen (2002), Vancouver (2004), Birmingham (2006), Melbourne (2008), Amsterdam (2010), San Francisco (2012), Tokyo (2014), Milan (2016) and Boston (2018). In 2020 the conference was held for the first time in virtual format.

A second virtual conference was held November 8–12, 2021. IEPA's 13th International Conference on Early Intervention in Mental Health was to be held in Singapore in 2022, however was cancelled due to the COVID-19 pandemic. 

IEPA's 14th International Conference on Early Intervention in Mental Health will be held in Lausanne Switzerland July 2023.

The association has awarded the Richard Wyatt Award to key contributors to the field of early psychosis since 2004. The recipients of this award have been::

 Patrick McGorry (2004)
 Max Birchwood (2006) 
 Thomas McGlashan (2008)
 Alison Yung (2010),
 David Shiers (2012)
 Eric Chen (2014)
 Merete Nordentoft (2016)
 Jan Olav Johannessen (2018)
 Jean Addington (2020)

Peer-reviewed journal 
The association has endorsed the Early Intervention in Psychiatry peer-reviewed journal. The inaugural issue was in February 2007 with Patrick McGorry as editor-in-chief.

References

External links
Official website
Conference website

Health care-related professional associations
Psychiatric associations
Mental health organisations in Australia